Qasr el Banat (also known as Euhemeria) is an ancient Roman fort located between Qift and Al-Qusayr in Egypt.

Inscriptions found nearby have been dated to the reigns of the emperors Augustus and Hadrian.

References

Archaeological sites in Egypt
Roman sites in Egypt